is a Japanese footballer who plays for Montedio Yamagata.

Club statistics
Updated to 28 July 2022.

References

External links
Profile at Renofa Yamaguchi

Profile at JEF United Chiba

1992 births
Living people
Fukuoka University alumni
Association football people from Kumamoto Prefecture
Japanese footballers
J1 League players
J2 League players
Sagan Tosu players
JEF United Chiba players
Matsumoto Yamaga FC players
Renofa Yamaguchi FC players
Kawasaki Frontale players
Montedio Yamagata players
Association football goalkeepers
Universiade bronze medalists for Japan
Universiade medalists in football
Medalists at the 2013 Summer Universiade